A kidult is an adult whose interests or media consumption is traditionally seen as more suitable for children. It can also mean a parent who acts childish with their children, but does not take on their duties as a disciplinarian.

Similar portmanteau terms for such people are rejuvenile and adultescent. A related concept is that of Peter Pan syndrome, where a person is reluctant to grow emotionally after childhood.

History
In the past, psychology recognized the concept of puer aeternus, or "eternal boy". Today, often called Peter Pan syndrome, it means a person remaining emotionally at that of a teenager or even a child. The name is derived from the archetypal literary eternal boy, Peter Pan.

The term kidult was first used in the 1950s by the television industry to refer to adult viewers who enjoyed television programs targeted at children. Thunderbirds, for example, was designed specifically to capitalize on this "kidult" demographic, and aired in the evening rather than in the afternoon to accomplish this.

One of the most well-known and extreme cases of Peter Pan syndrome and the kidult mentality is Michael Jackson. Jackson had explicitly stated that he did not want to grow up, and owned a large collection of arcade games, toy cars and fantasy and sci-fi memorabilia. Michael also had a fascination with the Peter Pan character, and attempted to create a theme park on his property called Neverland Ranch.

Modern usage
In the early 21st century, there was a sudden increase in reporting that for an adult to have interests traditionally expected only from children is not necessarily an anomaly. This is mostly due to the rise of the entertainment industry. The entertainment industry was quick to recognize the trend, and introduced a special category, "kidult", of things marketable for kids and adults alike. Enormous successes of films such as Shrek and Harry Potter, of animated television series such as My Little Pony: Friendship Is Magic the target demographic of young girls, of young adult fiction books traditionally targeted for teenagers and the fact that Disneyland is among the world's top adult (without kids) vacation destinations seem to indicate that "kidulthood" is a rather mainstream phenomenon. Kidulthood also appears to exist on the Internet, with grown adults treating each other like children, especially in political discussion on Twitter, by calling people "homegirl", "girlie", and "sweetie". And unlike puer aeternus, "rejuveniles" successfully marries adult responsibilities with non-adult interests. When Christopher Noxon appeared on The Colbert Report on June 29, 2006, he remarked that "There's a big difference between childish and childlike".

Karen Brooks has written about what she calls the "commodification of youth": entertainers sell "the teen spirit" to adults who in the past were called "young at heart".

In South Korea, the buzzword kideolteu was used in 2015, highlighting the market trend of increasing toy sales (such as drones and "electric wheels") to adults.

See also
 Boomerang Generation
 Otaku
 Fandom
 Peter Pan syndrome
 Youth subculture

References

Hobbies
Neologisms
Popular culture
Adulthood